Sjouke Jonker (9 September 1924, The Hague – 13 April 2007, Sierre) was a Dutch politician.

References 

1924 births
2007 deaths
Politicians from The Hague
Anti-Revolutionary Party politicians
Christian Democratic Appeal MEPs
MEPs for the Netherlands 1979–1984